Arnold Creek is a tributary of Huntington Creek in Luzerne County, Pennsylvania, in the United States. The creek is considered to be Class A Wild Trout Waters for its entire length. Brook trout naturally reproduce in it and beech trees occur along it. At least two bridges have been built over the creek, one of which carries Pennsylvania Route 118. A portion of it is in the Pennsylvania State Game Lands Number 206.

Course

Arnold Creek begins in a deep valley in Ross Township, only a few thousand feet from the edge of the watershed of Bowman Creek. It flows south-southwest for a few tenths of a mile before turning south-southeast for several tenths of a mile. The creek then receives an unnamed tributary from the left and flows south for more than a mile and its valley deepens. In this stretch, it receives two more unnamed tributaries: one from the left and one from the right. The creek's valley then becomes much shallower as it turns south-southwest and then south, crossing Pennsylvania Route 118 near the community of Kyttle. South of Pennsylvania Route 118, the creek turns south-southwest and flows around a bend before turning south-southeast for approximately a mile and a half. Its valley deepens again until the creek leaves the valley and reaches its confluence with Huntington Creek.

Tributaries
Arnold Creek has no named tributaries. However, it does have three unnamed tributaries.

Hydrology and geography
Upstream of Pennsylvania Route 118, the concentration of alkalinity in Arnold Creek is 4 milligrams per liter. Downstream of Pennsylvania Route 118, the alkalinity concentration in the creek increases to 5 milligrams per liter.

The creek's mouth is north of the community of Harveyville.

Watershed

Arnold Creek is entirely in the United States Geological Survey quadrangle of Sweet Valley. Upstream of Pennsylvania Route 118, 63 percent of the creek's length is open to the public. The remaining 37 percent is private land that is closed to the public. Downstream of Pennsylvania Route 118, only 59 percent of its length is open to the public. The remaining 41 percent is on private land that is closed to the public.

A portion of Arnold Creek is in Pennsylvania State Game Lands Number 206.

History
Arnold Creek was entered into the Geographic Names Information System on August 2, 1979. Its identifier in the Geographic Names Information System is 1168410.

A prestressed box beam bridge was built over Arnold Creek in 1957. Plans were made in 1996 to rehabilitate the bridge for an estimated cost of $3,000. The entire length of the creek were designated as Class A Wild Trout Waters in 1999.

Biology
Two sections of Arnold Creek are considered by the Pennsylvania Fish and Boat Commission to be Class A Wild Trout Waters. Both sections are Class A Wild Trout Waters for brook trout. The creek is one of six direct tributaries of Huntington Creek to be designated as Class A Wild Trout Waters. The others are Mitchler Run, Shingle Run, Lick Branch, Phillips Creek, and part of Kitchen Creek. Arnold Creek supports a trout population that naturally reproduces.

There is a young stand of beech trees growing on Arnold Creek.

See also
Lick Branch (Huntington Creek), next tributary of Huntington Creek going downstream
Shingle Run (Huntington Creek), next tributary of Huntington Creek going upstream
List of tributaries of Fishing Creek (North Branch Susquehanna River)

References

Rivers of Luzerne County, Pennsylvania
Tributaries of Fishing Creek (North Branch Susquehanna River)
Rivers of Pennsylvania